Herbert Henry Elvin (18 July 1874 – 10 November 1949) was a British trade unionist.

Born in Eckington, Derbyshire, Elvin left school at the age of 14, although he later studied with the People's Palace, Birkbeck College and the City of London College.  He became a preacher at the age of fifteen, and spent seven years in India.

Elvin joined the National Union of Clerks in 1894, and became a prominent figure, holding the post of honorary secretary from 1906, then general secretary from 1909, serving until 1941.  He was elected to the General Council of the Trades Union Congress (TUC) in 1925, and served as President of the TUC in 1938.  He also worked as British labour advisor to the International Labour Organization, and on the executive of the League of Nations Union.  In his spare time, he organised Slum Children's Outings for the East End.  He also stood unsuccessfully as a Labour Party candidate in Bath at the 1922 general election, then Watford in 1924, Spen Valley in 1929, and on one further occasion.  He was elected to Middlesex County Council to represent Harrow East in 1946.

Two of Elvin's children became prominent figures: Lionel became Principal of Ruskin College, and George became General Secretary of the Association of Cinematograph Television and Allied Technicians.

References

1874 births
1949 deaths
Alumni of Birkbeck, University of London
Councillors in Greater London
General Secretaries of the Association of Professional, Executive, Clerical and Computer Staff
Labour Party (UK) councillors
People from Eckington, Derbyshire
Presidents of the Trades Union Congress
Members of Middlesex County Council
Labour Party (UK) parliamentary candidates